Rohtas Dahiya Singh (born 2 July 1960) is an Indian wrestler. He competed in the men's freestyle 57 kg at the 1984 Summer Olympics. He received Arjun Award in 1998.

References

External links
 

1960 births
Living people
Indian male sport wrestlers
Olympic wrestlers of India
Wrestlers at the 1984 Summer Olympics
Place of birth missing (living people)
Recipients of the Arjuna Award